"Love Potion" is the twenty-first single by Japanese recording artist Alisa Mizuki. It was released on August 21, 2002, as the fifth single from Mizuki's fourth compilation album History: Alisa Mizuki Complete Single Collection. The title track is a Japanese-language cover Christina Aguilera's "Genie in a Bottle" (1998). The song served as theme song for the fourth and final season of the Fuji TV drama Nurse no Oshigoto.

The A-side and theme song for the drama was initially announced to be a cover of Madonna's "Crazy for You" (1985), however "Genie in a Bottle" ended up being the song Mizuki covered for the drama. The said cover of "Crazy for You" subsequently went unreleased.

"Love Potion" is Mizuki's second single to be issued in CCCD format.

Chart performance 
"Love Potion" debuted on the Oricon Weekly Singles chart at number 30 with 7,260 copies sold in its first week. The single charted for three weeks and has sold a total of 13,490 copies.

Track listing

Charts and sales

References 

2002 singles
Alisa Mizuki songs
Japanese television drama theme songs
Songs written by Steve Kipner
Songs written by Pam Sheyne
2002 songs
Songs written by David Frank (musician)
Avex Group singles